One party may refer to:

One-party state
The ONE Party, a political party in New Zealand
In law, a party to a legal action or contract

See also
Party